Contra: Hard Corps, released as  in Japan and Probotector in Europe and Australia, is a run and gun video game released by Konami for the Sega Genesis in 1994, making it the first game in the Contra series released for a Sega platform.

Set five years after the events of Contra III: The Alien Wars, a terrorist group led by the renegade Colonel Bahamut has stolen an alien cell recovered from the war and now intends to use it to produce weapons. A new task force, known as the titular "Hard Corps", are sent to deal with the situation. The game features a branching storyline with multiple possible endings.

Hard Corps spawned its own series of follow-ups; including the Appaloosa-developed sequels, Contra: Legacy of War & C: The Contra Adventure; and the Arc System Works-developed prequel, Hard Corps: Uprising. Hard Corps has since been considered to be a spin-off from the mainline Contra entries.

In June 2019, it was re-released as part of Contra: Anniversary Collection for Nintendo Switch, PlayStation 4, Windows, and Xbox One and was also included in the Genesis Mini dedicated console that same year. The game was also re-released on the Nintendo Switch Online + Expansion Pack on October 25, 2021.

Gameplay

The objective of each stage of the game is to reach the end by shooting at every enemy that gets in the way, and fight the boss awaiting at the end. While most of the game have the character walking on foot, certain stages have the player riding a Motoroid, a hoverbike that can transform into an ostrich-like robot. Unlike previous Contra games, which featured overhead segments in addition to the regular side-view stages, all the stages in Hard Corps  retains the standard side-view perspective for most of the game. Another difference is the player can now choose between one of four unique player characters. A new feature to the game is that the story is advanced through story cutscenes.

Like in the previous Contra games, a maximum of two players can play simultaneously, but they are not allowed to choose the same character.

The controls are similar to Contra III, but have been adapted to work with the Genesis's standard three-button controller, as well as the six-button controller. The three main buttons (A, B, and C) are used for switching between weapons, shooting, and jumping respectively in the default control configuration. By pressing the weapon change button while shooting (or the X, Y, or Z buttons on the six-button controller), the player can toggle between two shooting styles: one which allows for free movement while shooting, and another which keeps the character still while he or she aims in one of eight directions. The player can also jump down from certain platforms, as well as move on walls and ceilings like in Contra III. A new ability added to the game is a sliding technique performed by holding the direction-pad diagonally downwards while pressing the jump button. The character will be invulnerable while sliding and can even harm certain enemies.

The player can now carry up to four different weapons, as well as a supply of bombs. Like in previous games, weapons are obtained from flying capsule pods. This time the weapon items are now labeled "A", "B", "C", and "D", which will vary depending on the character controlled by the player. Each player begins with a standard machine gun, which can be upgraded to a different semi-automatic weapon by picking up the A-type power-up. When the player's character loses a life, the weapon they had equipped will be lost. Unlike Contra III, the player's supply of bombs will remain the same when a life is lost.

Another unique feature to Contra: Hard Corps is the addition of branching paths that allows the player to play through a different set of stages depending on key decisions made during key moments of the game's story.

The Japanese version, titled Contra: The Hard Corps, is significantly easier than its overseas counterparts due to the addition of a life gauge that allows the player to take three hits from an enemy before losing a life. The Japanese version also features unlimited continues, in contrast with the American version, which only allows the player to continue five times. Animator Yasuomi Umetsu provided the cover and manual illustrations for the Japanese version.

The PAL version of the game is titled Probotector and like the European localizations of previous Contra games for home consoles, the main characters (CX-1 through 4) and some of the enemies were renamed and replaced with robotic counterparts (Browny was left unchanged, with only his name changed). The plot was also rewritten, with Colonel Bahamut and Dead-Eye Joe being redesigned as humanoid aliens, and the alien cell was replaced with a computer device called the "X-Drive". The gameplay is the same as the North American version, but the player only has four continues in the European version, instead of five like in the North American release. Some cutscenes were also altered. For example, the player character no longer identifies the boss of Stage 1, a robot previously thought unmanned, to be piloted by a man, or Dr. Geo Mandrake being eaten by a monster created in his merger machine. It is also impossible to side with the Alien General in this version, thus eliminating one of the endings.

Plot
In 2641, an elite team of commandos called the "Unified Military Special Mobile Task Force K-X", also known as the "Contra Hard Corps", has been assembled to combat the rapid spread of crime and illegal activities following the war. When an unknown hacker infiltrates the city's security system and reprograms a group of unmanned robots to cause havoc, the Hard Corps are deployed to handle the situation. Members include male soldier Ray Poward; female soldier Sheena Etranzi; Brad Fang, a wolf-like humanoid with two cybernetic arms; and Browny, a small robot capable of hovering. Ray, Sheena and Brad later made a brief cameo appearance in the interactive game TwinBee Paradise in Donburishima.

The game begins when the Hard Corps are deployed on a big city to destroy a group of unmanned weapons that had been reprogrammed to attack civilians. At the end of the first stage, the player confronts a robot piloted by cyborg mercenary Deadeye Joe, who escapes after the battle. At this point, the Hard Corps receive an emergency call from Dr. Geo Mandrake informing them that the government's research center is being attacked by an unknown group. The player can choose to pursue Deadeye Joe or go to the research center to thwart the terrorists, each path leading to a different second stage. Regardless of the chosen path, both stages converge to a common route. In the third stage, the player is sent to a junkyard to apprehend the notorious hacker Noiman Cascade, while the fourth stage is set in the jungle, where the enemy's hideout is located. In the fifth stage, the Hard Corps will be caught in a trap by the enemy leader, Colonel Bahamut, and the player is given another choice. From this point on, depending on the player's choices, the storyline splits into four possible paths, each with its own outcome. There's also a hidden coliseum stage with its own ending, for a total of five possible outcomes.

Development
The score was written by Hiroshi Kobayashi, the secondary composers were Michiru Yamane, Akira Yamaoka, Hirofumi Taniguchi, and Aki Hata. The tune "Simon 1994 RD" is a remix of "Vampire Killer", a recurring theme music in the Castlevania series. The track is played in the secret Battle Stadium stage against the first enemy, an afro-haired cyborg who fights the player with a whip, as well as fishes thrown like a boomerang. His design is a pastiche of Castlevania protagonist Simon Belmont, as well as of Japanese singer Masato Shimon.

Reception

Japanese gaming magazine Famitsu gave the game a score of 24 out of 40. GamePro gave the game a positive review, praising the impressive bosses, "eye-catching" graphics, explosions "which test the limits of TV speakers", simple control configuration, and intense action. The four reviewers of Electronic Gaming Monthly also gave the game a recommendation for its four character selection, intense action, and impressive graphical effects, though they remarked that the difficulty can be extremely frustrating.

Next Generation reviewed the game, rating it three stars out of five, and stated that "Contra: Hard Corps is the ultimate side-scrolling shooter and a beast of a game that won't be easily defeated. And that's official."

References

External links
 

1994 video games
Contra (series)
Sega Genesis games
Video game spin-offs
Video games scored by Aki Hata
Video games scored by Akira Yamaoka
Video games scored by Michiru Yamane
Video games developed in Japan
Video games featuring female protagonists
Cooperative video games
Video games with alternate endings
Video games set in the 27th century
Video games about terrorism
Nintendo Switch Online games
Multiplayer and single-player video games